Wikstroemia oahuensis, the Ākia or Oahu false ohelo, is a species of flowering shrub in the mezereon family, Thymelaeaceae, that is endemic to Hawaii.

Description
The young branches are gray, yellow, or reddish brown. The leaves grow with two leaves opposite each other on the branch, overlapping, and are dark green or grayish on the upper surface and lighter green underneath. This species is highly variable, with the leaves ranging from large and long to small and round. The stems do not snap but peel when bent. It flowers irregularly throughout the year, but produces fewer flowers when the plant has mature fruit. The dwarf bog form from Kauai is sometimes recognized as a separate species, W. palustris.

Distribution
There are 12 Wikstroemia species endemic to the Hawaiian Islands. Wikstroemia oahuensis is a relatively common plant in a wide variety of habitats on the islands of Kauai, Oahu, Molokai, Lānai, and Maui.

Ecology
The bacteria species Flavobacterium akiainvivens was originally isolated from rotting ākia wood, and the shrub lends it its name.

Uses

Toxicity
Native Hawaiians used this species to stupefy fish. A poison made from ākia in combination with other plants was used to execute criminals.

Medicinal
Hawaiian medicinal uses are as a laxative and for treatment of asthma.  Possible anti-tumor activity.

Other
Ākia is used in Hawaii as landscape specimen.  Seeds and flowers are used to make beautiful lei.

References

oahuensis
Endemic flora of Hawaii
Plants described in 1913
Flora without expected TNC conservation status